The Piako County Tramway was built in 1882-83, just south of Te Aroha. It carried quartz from gold mines in the Kaimai Range to water-powered batteries in the Waiorongomai Stream valley below.

It was built to the rare  gauge, thought to be that used on bush tramways in the Waitawheta and neighbouring valleys.

A & G Price's first locomotive was built for the line, but proved too large for the curves and was sold for less than half its cost in 1885. It was later used for log haulage on Smyth Bros tramway at Kennedy's Bay.

The line included 3 self acting inclines, the longest being  up a 1 in 4 gradient.

Repairs ceased in 1924 and by 1932 the line was overgrown and unusable.

During the 1950s and 1960s, some rails were sold to local contractors, but in 1966 permission to remove rails was refused and in 1976, council scheduled the tramway as of historical and scientific interest. The tramway was listed as Category 1 in 1997.

DOC has restored parts of the tramway, now used by Waiorongomai Valley tramping tracks.

References

External links
 1880s photo of head of incline, trucks and winding gear

Railway companies of New Zealand
Narrow gauge railways in New Zealand
2 ft 9 in gauge railways
Matamata-Piako District
Rail transport in Waikato